Anthodon (meaning "flower tooth") is an extinct genus of pareiasaurid parareptile from the Permian period of South Africa and Tanzania.

History
Richard Owen, who described Anthodon, thought it was a dinosaur because dinosaurian skull material from the Early Cretaceous had become associated with the Permian material. The dinosaur material was later separated out by Robert Broom in 1912 and was renamed as the stegosaurid Paranthodon by Franz Nopcsa in 1929.

Description
This small form combines the primitive feature of interpterygoid fenestrae with an advanced feature of turtle-like armor. Small dermal ossicles covered the body, while the pattern of armor plates on the back reminiscent of a turtle shell. The tail was further shortened relative to less derived forms. Some other forms are characterized by having smooth skulls and armor on the dorsal midline.

Skull
The skull was small, and the cheekbones unornamented as in other pareiasaurids. The skull is 30 cm in length and quite lightly built. The cheekbones form very large quadratojugal "horns" that extend downwards to a great degree, but with a smooth unornamented surface. The mandible has ventral protrusions (further "horns"). The postparietals are fused and, along with the tabulars, located on the skull roof, as in more primitive diadectomorphs. There are 11 to 14 pairs of overlapping teeth, of small and uniform size, each with 8 to 15 cusps, giving them, as with all pareiasaurs, a leaf-like or flower like appearance, hence the generic name "flower tooth".

References

External links
 Elginiidae and Pumiliopareiasauria at Palaeos

Pareiasaurs
Permian reptiles of Africa
Taxa named by Richard Owen
Fossil taxa described in 1876
Prehistoric reptile genera